Chitralekha may refer to:

 Chitralekha (deity), a Hindu deity
 Chitralekha (novel), a 1934 Hindi historical novel by Bhagwati Charan Verma 
 Chitralekha (weekly), a Gujarati magazine
 Chitralekha (1941 film), a film based on the above novel
 Chitralekha (1964 film), another film based on the same novel, starring Meena Kumari and Ashok Kumar